The Hicks-Tinbergen Award is a biennial prize in economics awarded by the European Economic Association (EEA) to the author(s) of the best article published in the EEA's journal within the two preceding years. The Hicks-Tinbergen Award was created in 1991 and is named in honour of the Dutch econometrician Jan Tinbergen and the British economist John Hicks to show that the EEA supports both theoretical and empirical economic research in Europe. Until 2002, the journal of the EEA was the European Economic Review, which was subsequently replaced by the Journal of the European Economic Association. The Hicks-Tinbergen Award is generally awarded at the EEA's Annual Congress, after a committee of three economists has selected the winner among the nominations submitted by EEA members.

Past Recipients

A complete list of the past recipients of the Hicks-Tinbergen Award can be found on the website of the EEA.

See also

 List of economics awards

References

External links

 Profile of the Hicks-Tinbergen Award on the website of the EEA

Economics awards